NATO Mountain Warfare Centre of Excellence (NATO MW CoE) is one of NATO Centres of Excellence, located in Poljče, 27, 4275, Begunje na Gorenjskem, Slovenia. It assists NATO member countries, partners, other countries and international organizations, in order to enhance mountain warfare capabilities.

MW CoE was fully accredited in 2015. MW CoE activities with NATO are coordinated through HQ Allied Command Transformation.
The structure of MW CoE has four branches: 
 Doctrine and standardization branch;
 Training and education branch;
 Support branch;
 Concept development, experimentation and lessons learned branch.

Mission and task 
As a hub of knowledge, MW CoE develops or provides contributions to doctrines, concepts and procedures, the conduction of experiments and analyses, the provision of competence for NATO initiatives, projects, exercises and operations.

The work of the MW CoE is usually initiated through a Request for Support by a NATO entity or a participating nation. The annual Programme of Work contains various 'Projects', which have a customer and defined product with a clear end date and end state, and a number of 'Activities', which cover the permanent support to NATO Transformation. Furthermore, the MW CoE plans and conducts work related events like conferences and workshops

See also 
 List of mountain warfare forces
 Mountain Warfare
 Slovenian Armed Forces
 Multinational Centre of Excellence for Mountain Warfare
 Army Mountain Warfare School (United States)
 Hatsavita Mountain Warfare Training Centre (Russian Federation)
 Isonzo Front
 Allied Command Transformation

References

External links 
  Official Webpage
 NATO Mountain Warfare Centre of Excellence Memorandum of Understanding Signing Ceremony

NATO agencies
Military installations of Slovenia
Mountain warfare training installations